Arcadia Lake is a lake in Manistee County, Michigan. The lake, formerly called Bar Lake, is separated from Lake Michigan by a sand bar. A  dredged channel connects the two lakes.

See also
List of lakes in Michigan

References

Lakes of Manistee County, Michigan
Lakes of Michigan